Borzuchowo-Daćbogi  is a village in the administrative district of Gmina Grudusk, within Ciechanów County, Masovian Voivodeship, in East-Central Poland.

The village has a population of 31.

References

Villages in Ciechanów County